

ox

oxa

oxab-oxam
oxabolone cipionate (INN)
oxabrexine (INN)
oxaceprol (INN)
oxacillin (INN)
oxadimedine (INN)
oxaflozane (INN)
oxaflumazine (INN)
oxagrelate (INN)
oxalinast (INN)
oxaliplatin (INN)
oxamarin (INN)
oxametacin (INN)
oxamisole (INN)
oxamniquine (INN)

oxan-oxaz
oxanamide (INN)
Oxandrin Redirects to oxandrolone
oxandrolone (INN)
oxantel (INN)
oxapadol (INN)
oxapium iodide (INN)
oxapropanium iodide (INN)
oxaprotiline (INN)
oxaprozin (INN)
oxarbazole (INN)
oxatomide (INN)
oxazafone (INN)
oxazepam (INN)
oxazidione (INN)
oxazolam (INN)
oxazorone (INN)

oxc-oxf
oxcarbazepine (INN)
oxdralazine (INN)
oxeclosporin (INN)
oxeladin (INN)
oxendolone (INN)
oxepinac (INN)
oxetacaine (INN)
oxetacillin (INN)
Oxetine (Hexal Australia) [Au]. Redirects to paroxetine.
oxetorone (INN)
oxfendazole (INN)
oxfenicine (INN)

oxi

oxib-oxis
oxibendazole (INN)
oxibetaine (INN)
oxiconazole (INN)
oxidopamine (INN)
oxidronic acid (INN)
oxifentorex (INN)
oxifungin (INN)
oxiglutatione (INN)
Oxilan
oxilofrine (INN)
oxilorphan (INN)
oximonam (INN)
oxindanac (INN)
oxiniacic acid (INN)
oxiperomide (INN)
oxipurinol (INN)
oxiracetam (INN)
oxiramide (INN)
oxisopred (INN)
oxisuran (INN)

oxit
oxitefonium bromide (INN)
oxitriptan (INN)
oxitriptyline (INN)
oxitropium bromide (INN)

oxm-oxs
oxmetidine (INN)
oxodipine (INN)
oxogestone (INN)
oxolamine (INN)
oxolinic acid (INN)
oxomemazine (INN)
oxonazine (INN)
oxophenarsine (INN)
oxoprostol (INN)
oxpheneridine (INN)
oxprenoate potassium (INN)
oxprenolol (INN)
Oxsoralen

oxy
Oxy-Kesso-Tetra

oxyb-oxym
oxybenzone (INN)
oxybuprocaine (INN)
oxybutynin (INN)
Oxycet (Mallinckrodt)
oxycinchophen (INN)
oxyclipine (INN)
oxyclozanide (INN)
oxycodone (INN)
OxyContin (Purdue Pharma)
oxydipentonium chloride (INN)
oxyfedrine (INN)
oxyfenamate (INN)
Oxylone
oxymesterone (INN)
oxymetazoline (INN)
oxymetholone (INN)
oxymorphone (INN)

oxyp-oxyt
oxypendyl (INN)
oxypertine (INN)
oxyphenbutazone (INN)
oxyphencyclimine (INN)
oxyphenisatine (INN)
oxyphenonium bromide (INN)
oxypurinol (INN)
oxypyrronium bromide (INN)
oxyridazine (INN)
oxysonium iodide (INN)
oxytetracycline (INN)
oxytocin (INN)
Oxytrol

oz
ozagrel (INN)
ozarelix (INN)
ozolinone (INN)